Richard Evers (born May 31, 1959) is a Canadian publisher, programmer, technology consultant and author.  Evers was editor and publisher of The Transactor and Transactor for the Amiga. He has worked for a number of Canadian technology companies, including Research in Motion, where he edited the BlackBerry Developer Journal. He is president of Northern Blue Publishing in Waterloo, Ontario, and co-author of Professional BlackBerry (Wrox) and co-author of The Trackers. He later founded Kryptera, an encryption technology for data at rest.

Evers has served as technical editor of BlackBerry for Dummies (2011); BlackBerry Pearl 3G for Dummies (2011); BlackBerry Java Application Development (2010); BlackBerry ALL-IN-ONE for Dummies (2010); BlackBerry Curve for Dummies (2010); BlackBerry Storm for Dummies (2009); and Mobile Guide to BlackBerry (2005).

Bibliography
The Inner Space Anthology (1985) 
Transactor Book of Bits and Pieces (1986) 
Professional BlackBerry (2005) 
The Trackers (2013)

References

External links
The Transactor: The Tech/News Journal for Commodore Computers

1957 births
Living people
American technology writers
Canadian technology writers
Canadian book publishers (people)
Writers from Ontario